Palaiochori is a village in the municipal unit of Gastouni, Elis, Greece.  Palaiochori is situated in a flat rural area, 3 km from the Ionian Sea. It is 2 km west of Savalia, 4 km southeast of Gastouni, 3 km northwest of Roviata and 8 km northwest of Amaliada. The mouth of the river Pineios is near Palaiochori.

Historical population

External links
Palaiochori on GTP Travel Pages (in English and Greek)

See also

List of settlements in Elis

References

Populated places in Elis